Om! is the fourth studio album by Swedish singer-songwriter Niklas Strömstedt, released in 1990, by WEA.

Track listing

Charts

References

External links 

 

1990 albums
Niklas Strömstedt albums
Polar Music albums
Warner Music Group albums